Araji Line (a.k.a. Arajiline & Arazeeline) is a village in Varanasi district in the Indian state of Uttar Pradesh. It is about 275 kilometers from the state capital Lucknow and 798 kilometers from the national capital Delhi.

Transportation
Araji Line can be accessed by road as it does not have a train station. Closest Indian railway stations are Manduadih & Varanasi railway stations. Nearest operational airports are Varanasi airport (46 kilometers) and Patna airport (258 kilometers).

See also

Varanasi

References 

Villages in Varanasi district